Devaneya Pavanar (also known as G. Devaneyan, Ñanamuttan Tevaneyan; 7 February 1902 – 15 January 1981) was a prominent Tamil scholar who wrote over 35 research volumes. Additionally, he was a staunch proponent of the "Pure Tamil movement" and initiated the Etymological Dictionary Project primarily to bring out the roots of Tamil words and their connections and ramifications with Nostratic studies.

In his 1966 Primary Classical language of the World, he argues that the Tamil language is the "most natural" and also a proto-world language, being the oldest language of the world, from which all other major languages of the world are derived. He believed that its literature, later called Sangam literature and usually considered to have been written from 200 BCE and 300 CE, spanned a huge period from 10,000 to 5,500 BCE. Mainstream linguists, geologists and historians do not subscribe to his theories.

Devaneya Pavanar composed many musical pieces (Isaik kalambakam) and many noteworthy poems, including the collection of Venpa. The title  was conferred on him by the Tamil Nadu State Government in 1979, and he was also addressed as Dravida Mozhi nool Nayiru ("Sun of Dravidian languages").

Biography
Gnanamuthu Devaneyan Pavanar was a Tamil professor at Municipal College, Salem, from 1944 to 1956. From 1956 to 1961, he was the head of Dravidian department at Annamalai University. He was a member of the Tamil Development and Research Council, set up by the Nehru government in 1959, entrusted with producing Tamil school and college textbooks. From 1974, he was director of the Tamil Etymological Project, and he acted as president of the International Tamil League, Tamil Nadu. (U. Tha. Ka.).

The Chennai District Central Library is named after Devanaya Pavanar and is located at Anna Salai, Chennai.

Views on Tamil versus Sanskrit

Pavanar's Vadamoli Varalaru argues that hundreds of Sanskrit words can be traced to a Tamil origin, and at the same time he insisted that pure Tamil equivalents existed for Sanskrit loan words. He claimed that Tamil is a "superior and more divine" language than Sanskrit. In his view the Tamil language originated in "Lemuria", the cradle of civilisation and place of origin of language. He believed that evidence of Tamil's antiquity was being suppressed by Sanskritists.

Pavanar's timeline for the evolution of mankind and Tamil is as follows:
 ca. 500,000 BC: origin of the human race,
 ca. 200,000 to 50,000 BC: evolution of "the Tamilian or Homo Dravida ",
 c. 200,000 to 100,000 BC, beginnings of Tamil
 c. 100,000 to 50,000 BC, growth and development of Tamil,
 50,000 BC: Kumari Kandam civilisation
 20,000 BC: A lost Tamil culture on Easter Island which had an advanced civilisation
 16,000 BC: Lemuria submerged
 6087 BC: Second Tamil Sangam established by a Pandya king
 3031 BC: A Chera prince wandering in the Solomon Islands saw wild sugarcane and started cultivation in Tamil Nadu.
 1780 BC: The Third Tamil Sangam established by a Pandya king
 7th century BC: Tolkāppiyam, the earliest extant Tamil grammar

In the preface to his 1966 book The Primary Classical Language of the World he wrote:

In a chapter entitled Tamil more divine than Sanskrit, Pavanar gives the reasons why he judges Tamil to be "more divine" than Sanskrit, arguing for "Primary Classicality of Tamil", he enumerates :

Publishing history
The Central Plan Scheme for Classical Tamil of the Centre of Excellence for Classical Tamil recommends
"To publish the translated but not yet published Sattambi Swamigal's Adhibhasa which seeks to establish that Tamil is the most ancient language. When published, it will provide an impetus to Pavanar's findings"

The literary works and books of Pavanar have been "nationalised" by the Government of Tamil Nadu in the course of the "Golden Jubilee year of National Independence" (2006). This means that the copyright for Pavanar's work is now owned by the state of Tamil Nadu, his legal heirs having been compensated financially.

Awards and honours
 A Silver plate presented to him by the Tamil Peravai, Salem in 1955 in appreciation of his service to Tamil.
 A Copper Plate presented to his by the Governor of Tamil Nadu 1960 in appreciation of his contribution to the collection of administrative terms in Tamil.
 A Silver Plate presented to his by the South Indian Saiva Sinddhanta Works Publishing Society, Thirunelveli Ltd., in 1970 in appreciations of his research work in Tamil philology and etymology.
 Official centenary celebrations of Pavanar were held at Sankarankoil (5 February 2002) and Gomathimuthupuram (6 February) of Tirunelveli district and at Chennai (8. February), attended by the Minister for Education and the Chief Minister O. Panneerselvam.
 In February 2006, a commemorative stamp of Devaneya Pavanar was released by the Postal Department in Chennai.
In October 2007, a memorial was installed at Madurai by the Government of Tamil Nadu in honour of Devaneya Pavanar.

Tamil
 , 1940.
 , 1943.
  = The mother of the Dravidian languages, [1969]
  ("etymological essays"), 1973.
 , 1978.
posthumously:
 , 1982.
 , 1985.
 , 1985–2005
 , 1991.
 , 1999.
 , 2001.
  centenary edition:
 , 2000.
 , 2000.
 , 2000.
 , 2000.
 , 2000.
 , 2000.
 , 2000.
 , 2000.
  ("comparative linguistics"), 2000–<2001 >
 , 2001.
 , 2001.
 , 2001.
 , 200101.
 , 2001.

See also
 Kumari Kandam
 Maraimalai Adigal
 Tanittamil Iyakkam
 Anti-Hindi agitations
 Indigenous Aryans
 Paleolithic continuity theory
 Divine language
 Nationalism and ancient history

References

Further reading
 Iravatham Mahadevan, Aryan or Dravidian or Neither? A Study of Recent Attempts to Decipher the Indus Script (1995–2000) EJVS (ISSN 1084-7561) vol. 8 (2002) issue 1 (8 March).
 Vasant Kaiwar, Sucheta Mazumdar, Robin Nelson, Antinomies of Modernity: Essays on Race, Orient, Nation (2003), p. 141.
 P. Ramanathan (trans.), Nostratics – The Light From Tamil According to Devaneyan (1977–80 studies of G. Devaneyan on the spread in different Language families of the world of derivatives from 22 basic Tamil words), Chennai: The Tirunelveli South India Saiva Siddhanta Works Publishing Society Ltd., 2004.
 Sumathi Ramaswamy, Passions of the Tongue: Language Devotion in Tamil India, 1891–1970, Studies on the History of Society and Culture, No 29, University of California Press (1997), .
 Sumathi Ramaswamy, The Lost Land of Lemuria: Fabulous Geographies, Catastrophic Histories University of California Press (2004), .
 Mu Tamilkkutimakan, Pavanarum tanittamilum, Moli ñayiru Tevaneyap Pavanar Arakkattalaic Corpolivu (On linguistics and historical philosophy of Ñā. Tēvanēyaṉ), International Institute of Tamil Studies, Ulakat Tamilaraycci Niruvanam (1985).
 Sahitya Akademi, Tevaneyap Pavanar, Cakittiya Akkatemi, 2002, .

External links
 Devaneya Pavanar (Official Website)
 publications (worldcatlibraries.org)

1902 births
1981 deaths
People from Tirunelveli district
Poets from Tamil Nadu
Tamil-language writers
Tirukkural commentators
Tamil poets
Tamil activists
Tamil language activists
Academic staff of Annamalai University
20th-century Indian poets
Indian male poets
20th-century Indian historians
Pseudoarchaeologists
Pseudohistorians
Pseudolinguistics
Language and mysticism